Toomas Asser (born on 14 July 1954 in Jõhvi) is Estonian medical scientist, Member of the Estonian Academy of Sciences (2011) and since 1 August 2018 Rector of the University of Tartu.

Education and career 
Asser graduated from Nõo Secondary School (1973) and the Faculty of Medicine of Tartu State University (1979). 

In 1989, Asser defended his PhD in Medicine at Moscow N. Burdenko Institute of Neurosurgery with his candidate’s dissertation on cerebral blood flow regulation issues and stereotactic operations using the original thermocautery. 

In 1979–1989, he was Assistant and in 1989−1995 Associate Professor at the Neurology Clinic of Tartu State University. In 1988−1989, Asser trained at the Institute of Brain Diseases of Tohoku University (Japan). 

Since 1995, Asser is Professor of Neurosurgery of the University of Tartu. 

From 1996 to 2018, Asser was the Head of Department of Neurology and Neurosurgery of Tartu University Hospital and from 2000 to 2009 also the Dean of University of Tartu Faculty of Medicine. 

On 26 April 2018, Toomas Asser was elected the Rector of the University of Tartu at extraordinary elections. 

In 2011, he was elected as a member of the Estonian Academy of Sciences in medical science. He belongs to the academy’s Division of Biology, Geology and Chemistry and is the head of this division since 2014.

He belongs to the standing committee on medical science and health strategy of the Estonian Academy of Sciences.

He is also Vice-Chair of The Guild (The Guild of European Research-Intensive Universities) and President of Universities Estonia.

Research 
His research focuses on clinical and molecular-biological aspects of brain tumors, pituitary surgery, surgical treatment of intracranial aneurysms, functional surgery (deep brain stimulation for Parkinson’s disease) and spinal cord injuries.

Recognition 
 1997 Tohoku University Medal 
 2009 Medal of the University of Tartu Faculty of Medicine 
 2009 Badge of honour of the Estonian Medical Association 
  2011 Special recognition diploma of the World Cultural Council 
 2013 Order of the Estonian Red Cross, 1st class 
 2014 University of Tartu Grand Medal 
 2019 Latvian Cross of Recognition,  3rd class (Commander)

External links 
 Toomas Asser in the Estonian Research Information System 
 Toomas Asser on the home page of the Estonian Academy of Sciences 
 Video and photos: Rector of the University of Tartu Toomas Asser took oath of office on 28 August 2018 
 „Native language higher education and science are a treasure“, on 20 December 2019
 The University of Tartu Senate’s address to the people of Ukraine On 7 March 2022.

1954 births
Estonian neurologists
Living people
University of Tartu alumni
Rectors of the University of Tartu
Academic staff of the University of Tartu
People from Jõhvi